Hakea repullulans, commonly known as the furze hakea, is a flowering plant in the family Proteaceae found in Victoria and South Australia.

Description
It resprouts from a lignotuber often suckering from horizontal roots. The branchlets are densely covered with short, soft, matted hairs and become smooth at flowering. Each inflorescence has 10–36  cream-white flowers appearing in the leaf axils.

Taxonomy and naming
Hakea repullulans was first formally described in 1984 by H.M. Lee  and the description was  published in the Australian Journal of Botany. It is named from the Latin repullulans for sprouting again, with reference to the lignotuberous resprouting and suckering  habit of this species.

Distribution and habitat
Furze hakea occurs from south-eastern South Australia  to the Grampians National Park and western regions of Victoria and east to the Otway Ranges also near Sale in South Gippsland. This species grows in acidic sandy soil in sclerophyll forests and scattered populations in mallee-heath.

References

repullulans
Plants described in 1985
Flora of Victoria (Australia)
Flora of South Australia
Proteales of Australia